A by-election was conducted for the Queensland Legislative Assembly seat of Stafford on 19 July 2014 following 23 May resignation of LNP MP Chris Davis. The LNP won Stafford from Labor at the 2012 election with 57.1 percent of the two-party vote from a 14.4-point two-party swing. The 2014 Redcliffe by-election saw a 17.2-point two-party swing to Labor. Analysts predicted a Labor win with a 10–12-point two-party swing. Labor candidate Anthony Lynham won the by-election with a 62 percent two-party vote from a 19.1-point two-party swing.

This election was the first in Australia which required voter identification to be shown prior to receiving a ballot paper.

Key dates
 19 June 2014: Issue of writ
 25 June 2014: Close of electoral roll
 3 July 2014: Close of nominations
 7 July 2014: Pre-poll voting started
 19 July 2014: Polling day
 29 July 2014: Cut-off for return of postal votes
 4 September 2014: Return of writ

Nominations
The four candidates in ballot paper order were as follows:

Katter's Australian Party, which received 4.9 percent in 2012, did not re-contest Stafford at the by-election. Clive Palmer initially said the Palmer United Party would run in the by-election, but then said it was undecided whether the party would field a candidate. A candidate was not fielded.

Result

The result saw the biggest swing at a Queensland by-election since changes to the 1992 Electoral Act.

See also

 List of Queensland state by-elections

References

External links
 2014 Stafford by-election: ECQ
 2014 Stafford by-election: Antony Green ABC
 Queensland set for another by-election: Antony Green ABC
 Stafford by-election to be test of new Voter ID laws: Antony Green ABC
 Dr Chris Davis MP - Stafford poll - 21 May 2014: ReachTEL 

2014 elections in Australia
Queensland state by-elections
2010s in Queensland